The Naval Air Systems Command Program Executive Offices (PEOs) are organizations responsible for the prototyping, procurement, and fielding of naval air equipment. Their mission is to develop, acquire, field and sustain affordable and integrated state of the art equipment for the Navy. 

The Naval Air Systems Command is organizationally aligned to the Chief of Naval Operations.  As part of its mission, NAVAIR provides support, manpower, resources, and facilities to its aligned Program Executive Offices (PEOs).  The Program Executive Offices are responsible for the execution of major defense acquisition programs.  The PEOs are organizationally aligned to the Assistant Secretary of the Navy for Research, Development and Acquisition (ASN(RDA)).  The Naval Aviation PEOs are co-located with the Naval Air Systems Command at the Naval Air Station Patuxent River, MD, and operate under NAVAIR policies and procedures.

There are five Naval Air Systems Program Executive Offices.

Program Executive Office, Air Anti-Submarine Warfare, Assault & Special Mission (PEO(A)) 

PEO(A) provides the Navy and Marine Corps with helicopters, special mission aircraft, and aviation anti-submarine warfare equipment and aircraft.  

The Program Executive Officer for PEO(A) is Maj. Gen. Gregory L. Masiello, U.S. Marine Corps, who assumed this post in May 2018.

PEO(A) comprises nine major program offices:

 PMA-207: Tactical Airlift Program
 PMA-261: H-53 Helicopters Program
 PMA-264: Air Anti-Submarine Warfare Systems Program
 PMA-271: Airborne Strategic Command, Control and Communications Program
 PMA-274: Presidential Helicopters Program
 PMA-275: V-22 Joint Program
 PMA-276: H1 Program
 PMA-290: Maritime Patrol and Reconnaissance Aircraft (MPRA) Program
 PMA-299: H-60 Multi-mission Helicopter Program

Program Executive Office, Aviation Common Systems and Commercial Services (PEO(CS)) 

PEO(CS) provides the Navy and Marine Corps with aviation common systems, services, and support, which decreases investment and sustainment costs and reduces the numbers of configurations in the Fleet.  

The Program Executive Officer for PEO(CS) is Mr. Gary Kurtz, SES.

PEO(CS) comprises six major program offices:

 PMA-202: Aircrew Systems Program
 PMA-205: Naval Aviation Training Systems and Ranges Program
 PMA-209: Air Combat Electronics Program
 PMA-226: Specialized and Proven Aircraft Program
 PMA-260: Common Aviation Support Equipment Program
 PMWA-170: Navy Communications and GPS Navigation Program

Program Executive Office, Tactical Aircraft Programs (PEO(T)) 

PEO(T) provides the Navy and Marine Corps with full life-cycle support of naval aviation aircraft, weapons and systems.

The Program Executive Officer for PEO(T) is Rear Adm. John Lemmon, U.S. Navy.

PEO(T) comprises nine major program offices:

 PMA-213: Naval Air Traffic Management Systems Program
 PMA-231: E-2/C-2 Airborne Command and Control Systems Program
 PMA-234: Airborne Electronic Attack Systems Program
 PMA-251: Aircraft Launch and Recovery Equipment Program
 PMA-257: AV-8B Program
 PMA-259: Air-To-Air Missiles Program
 PMA-265: F/A-18 and EA-18G Program
 PMA-272: Advanced Tactical Aircraft Protection Systems Program
 PMA-273: Naval Undergraduate Flight Training Systems Program

Program Executive Office, Unmanned Aviation and Strike Weapons (PEO(U&W)) 

PEO(U&W) provides the Navy and Marine Corps with unmanned aircraft, weapons and target systems.

The Program Executive Officer for PEO(U&W) is Rear Adm. Brian Corey, U.S. Navy.

PEO(U&W) comprises nine major program offices:

 PMA-201: Precision Strike Weapons Program
 PMA-208: Aerial Targets Program
 PMA-242: Direct and Time Sensitive Strike Program
 PMA-262: Persistent Maritime Unmanned Aircraft Systems Program
 PMA-263: Navy and Marine Corps Small Tactical Unmanned Aircraft Systems Program
 PMA-266: Multi-Mission Tactical Unmanned Aerial Systems (UAS) Program
 PMA-268: Unmanned Carrier Aviation Program
 PMA-280: Tomahawk Weapons System Program
 PMA-281: Strike Planning and Execution Systems Program

Program Executive Office, F-35 Lightning II (PEO(F-35)) 

PEO(F-35), also known as the Joint Strike Fighter Program, is tasked with defining affordable next generation strike aircraft weapon systems for the Navy, Air Force, Marines, and allies.

The Program Executive Officer for PEO(F-35) is Lt. Gen. Eric T. Fick, USAF.

Products 
NAVAIR operations can also be subdivided into five product areas:

 Fixed Wing
 Rotorcraft
 Weapons
 Unmanned
 Aviation Systems

See also 
Marine Corps Systems Command
Naval Sea Systems Command
Naval Information Warfare Systems Command
Naval Facilities Engineering Command
Naval Supply Systems Command

Footnotes

Shore commands of the United States Navy
Air Systems Command
Military in Maryland